Raumati Beach is a beach community on the Kapiti Coast of New Zealand's North Island; located 60km north-west of Wellington, and about 10 km north of Raumati South. It is immediately to the south-west of the larger town of Paraparaumu. The Maungakotukutuku area is located immediately behind Raumati.

"Raumati" is the Māori language word for "summer".

Following the laying out of Raumati Beach as a seaside resort in 1908, the first general store was built in Raumati Beach in 1919.

The town has many landmarks including Kapiti College, in which Peter Jackson (New Zealand filmmaker) and Christian Cullen (Rugby Union footballer) received their education, St. Mark's Church, the vast sandy beach (popular for walks, fishing and people on holiday), Raumati Beach Shopping Village, Kapiti Island and Weka Park.

The Wharemauku Stream meets the sea in Raumati Beach on the northern side of Raumati Marine Gardens. This park is a popular recreation location: it features a ridable miniature railway. The Beach offers a boat ramp and a tractor is on offer from the Raumati Fishing Club.

During the year several large events are held at Raumati Beach including the Raumati Beach Surf Casting competition which attracts hundreds of fisherman from all around New Zealand. The Kapiti Woman's Triathlon is also held annually within the Marine Gardens and attracts large crowds and is well supported.

Demographics

There were 2,103 households. There were 2,418 males and 2,823 females, giving a sex ratio of 0.86 males per female, with 1,008 people (19.2%) aged under 15 years, 723 (13.8%) aged 15 to 29, 2,220 (42.4%) aged 30 to 64, and 1,287 (24.6%) aged 65 or older.

Ethnicities were 91.0% European/Pākehā, 11.2% Māori, 2.3% Pacific peoples, 4.2% Asian, and 2.3% other ethnicities (totals add to more than 100% since people could identify with multiple ethnicities).

The proportion of people born overseas was 24.2%, compared with 27.1% nationally.

Although some people objected to giving their religion, 55.5% had no religion, 33.8% were Christian, 0.2% were Hindu, 0.1% were Muslim, 0.6% were Buddhist and 2.7% had other religions.

Of those at least 15 years old, 1,116 (26.4%) people had a bachelor or higher degree, and 609 (14.4%) people had no formal qualifications. The employment status of those at least 15 was that 1,800 (42.5%) people were employed full-time, 648 (15.3%) were part-time, and 138 (3.3%) were unemployed.

Sports and parks 

Weka Park is a public park in Raumati Beach. It is the home ground of the local soccer team, Kapiti Coast United. Cricket is also played at the park, and it has a children's playground.

The Kapiti Bears and Kapiti Coast Rugby League Club is on the border of Raumati South and Raumati Beach. The Club was founded in the 1970s and was the home of Kiwi and Melbourne Storm player, now Kiwi coach Stephen Kearney.  The Club operates out of Matthews Park, Menin Road, and is affiliated to the Wellington Rugby League Zone.

The local football club, Kapiti Coast United, plays at Weka Park in Raumati Beach.

Education

References

External links 
Raumati Beach Home Page
Kapiti Bears
Raumati Beach Primary School

Populated places in the Wellington Region
Kapiti Coast District
Beaches of the Wellington Region